Dekin may refer to:

Dékin, Benin
Dikin, Iran

See also
Decene, a hydrocarbon